The Grand Duchess Charlotte Maternity Hospital is a maternity hospital, part of the Centre Hospitalier de Luxembourg in Luxembourg. The hospital is named after Charlotte, Grand Duchess of Luxembourg, who reigned from 1919 to 1964.

History
In 1936 the development of a maternity hospital in Luxembourg went under the leadership of the Red Cross director Dr. M. Bohler and the school of the state of Pfaffenthal, under the control of the state, with the first director Dr. Richard.

During World War II the hospital was under control of the state, under the direction of Dr. M. Reile.

In 1951 the first incubator was introduced at the hospital. Between 1952 and 1966 the unit of medical gymnastics for childbirth and the gynecology department were opened.

On December 10, 1975, together with the Pediatric Clinic and the Municipal Hospital the Centre Hospitalier de Luxembourg was formed.

Famous births 
Grand Duke Henri and Grand Duchess Maria Theresa's children Prince Guillaume, Prince Felix, Prince Louis, Princess Alexandra and Prince Sebastian were born in Grand Duchess Charlotte Maternity Hospital.
Prince Louis and Princess Tessy's son Noah was born on 21 September 2007 at the Grand Duchess Charlotte Maternity Hospital.
Prince Felix and Princess Claire's daughter Amalia was born on 15 June 2014 at the Grand Duchess Charlotte Maternity Hospital.
Hereditary Grand Duke Guillaume and Hereditary Grand Duchess Stéphanie‘s son Prince Charles was born on 10 May 2020 at the Grand Duchess Charlotte Maternity Hospital.

See also 
Centre Hospitalier de Luxembourg
Municipal Hospital

References

Further reading
 Prum, Antoine: Maternité Grande-Duchesse Charlotte in: L'architecture moderniste à Luxembourg. Les années 30. S. 36 - S. 41, Musée d'histoire de la Ville de Luxembourg, 1997, .

External links
Grand Duchess Charlotte Maternity Hospital website (French)

Hospitals established in 1936
Hospitals in Luxembourg
Maternity hospitals
1936 establishments in Luxembourg
Maternity in Luxembourgh